Edwin Montgomery Bruce Vaughan (6 March 1856 – 13 June 1919), known as E. M. Bruce Vaughan, was an ecclesiastical architect from Cardiff, Wales.

Biography
Vaughan was born in Frederick Street, Cardiff and privately schooled in the town. He was articled to local architect W. D. Blessley, studied at Cardiff School of Science and Art and won the Architectural Association medal in 1880.

He was elected to the Royal Institute of British Architects in 1891, designing a large number of churches across South Wales, but also designed several hospitals and a school. The building described as his "masterpiece" is St James Church on Newport Road, Cardiff, completed in 1893.

While serving in the Glamorganshire Home Guard of the Volunteer Force he rose to the honorary rank of Lieutenant-Colonel.
Vaughan in later life became a volunteer and fundraiser for the King Edward VII Hospital, which he partly designed, with his work helping to fund an additional 350 beds and £500,000 in funds (much donated by shipowner, John Cory).

Vaughan died in June 1919 "one of the best known men in Cardiff" He had a well-attended funeral at St John's Church and was buried at the cemetery in Adamsdown.

Notable works

Vaughan was designer of 45 churches in Glamorgan beginning with St Mary Magdalene, Cwmbach (1881/2). Other notable examples included:
 All Saints, Barry
 St James, Adamsdown, Cardiff (1893)
 St Stephen's, Butetown, Cardiff (1902)
 St Jude's, Mount Pleasant, Swansea, (1913–15) 

Non-ecclesiastical works included:
  Institute of Physiology, Cardiff University, Newport Road, Cardiff (1915) – Vaughan campaigned successfully to locate the Institute close to the hospital and appointed himself as the designer.

References

External links

1856 births
1919 deaths
Architects from Cardiff
Welsh ecclesiastical architects
Fellows of the Royal Institute of British Architects
19th-century Welsh architects
20th-century Welsh architects
Alumni of Cardiff School of Art and Design
Burials in Cardiff
Military personnel from Cardiff
British Army officers